Baddi Bangaramma is a 1984 Indian Kannada language film directed by Kommineni. It is the remake of Telugu movie Konte Koddulu, directed by Kommineni. It stars Srinath, Jai Jagadish, Bhavya, Mahalakshmi, Ramakrishna and Uma Shivakumar, who played the titular role of Baddi Bangaramma, in pivotal roles. Uma Shivakumar's performance as a moneylender in the film received appreciation and was henceforth referred to as Baddi Bangaramma by the audience.

Cast

 Srinath as General Knowledge Janaki Ram
 Uma Shivakumar Baddi Bangaramma
 Jai Jagadish as Shekar
 Ramakrishna as Gopi
 Bhavya as Bhagya lakshmi
 Mahalakshmi
 Dinesh as Kokke Kodanda
 Jayamalini Mrudanga Mandakini
 Anuradha Tabala Kamala
 P. R. Varalakshmi
 Jayavijaya
 Kunigal Nagabhushan
 Shivaprakash
 Sarigama Vijaykumar
 Pemmasani Ramakrishna

Soundtrack

K. Chakravarthy composed the music for the film, with lyrics for the soundtracks written by Dodddarange Gowda and R. N. Jayagopal.

References

External links
 

1984 films
1980s Kannada-language films
Films scored by K. Chakravarthy